The 1984 Washington Huskies football team was an American football team that represented the University of Washington during the 1984 NCAA Division I-A football season.  In its tenth season under head coach Don James, the team compiled an 11–1 record, was ranked a close second in the two  and outscored its opponents  

    
Washington defeated second-ranked  NCAA-designated major selectors Berryman (QPRS), Football News, and National Championship Foundation (NCF), each selected Washington as their national champion, with NCF splitting its selection with the BYU Cougars. However, the final AP and Coaches polls both declared the BYU Cougars as national champions.

Ron Holmes was selected as the team's most valuable player.  Jim Rodgers was selected for the Guy Flaherty Most Inspirational award. Dan Eernissee, Danny Greene, Tim Meamber, and Rodgers were the team captains.

Schedule

Roster

Rankings

Game summaries

Northwestern

at Michigan

Houston

Miami (OH)

at Oregon State

at Stanford

Oregon

Arizona

California

at USC

at Washington State

vs. Oklahoma (Orange Bowl)

NFL Draft
Seven Huskies were selected in the 1985 NFL Draft.

References

Washington
Washington Huskies football seasons
Orange Bowl champion seasons
College football national champions
Washington Huskies football